Ergün Poyraz (born 31 January 1963) is a  prolific Turkish author known for his controversial books about the ruling Justice and Development Party, the Islamic preacher Fethullah Gülen, and people associated with them. He is best known for his 2007 book Children of Moses, which accused Prime Minister Recep Tayyip Erdoğan and his wife of being secret Jews and of cooperating with Israeli intelligence to undermine Turkish secularism. He was arrested in 2007 and was a defendant in the Ergenekon trials; on 5 August 2013, he was sentenced to 29 years in prison.

Life
Poyraz graduated from the Yıldız Technical University.

According to Milliyet, Poyraz contributed to the 1998 closure of the Welfare Party (RP) "by presenting to the Constitutional Court [secret] footage of RP leader Necmettin Erbakan's speeches."

Poyraz' 2007 book Children of Moses accused Prime Minister Recep Tayyip Erdoğan and his wife of being secret Jews and cooperating with Israeli intelligence to undermine Turkish secularism. His book The Rose of Moses contains similar allegations about President Abdullah Gül. At the time of his 2007 arrest Poyraz appears to have been working on a book about Deniz Baykal.

In 2013, Poyraz lost a libel case brought on behalf of the preacher Fethullah Gülen, the leader of the controversial Islamic Gülen movement, over his book Amerika'daki İmam ("The Imam in America").

Ergenekon
He was arrested in 2007 and charged with membership of the Association for the Union of Patriotic Forces (VKGB), which is said to be linked to the Ergenekon organization. According to Taraf, Poyraz was paid by the JITEM military intelligence unit; General Levent Ersöz has also spoken of payments to Poyraz.

According to media reports, the Turkish Gendarmerie bought thousands of copies of Poyraz' books.

In August 2013, he was sentenced to 29 years and 4 months in prison.

In April 2022 he was attacked in Kuşadası and hospitalised.

Some of his books
 Fethullah’ın Gerçek Yüzü / Said-i Nursi’den Demirel ve Ecevit’e ("The Real Face of Fethullah: From Said-i Nursi to Demirel and Ecevit"), Otopsi, İstanbul, 2000.
 Misyonerler Arasında Altı Ay ("Six Months Among Missionaries"), 2004
 Kanla Abdest Alanlar ("Those Who Perform their Ablutions with Blood"), Togan Yayıncılık, İstanbul, 2007.
 Musa'nın Çocukları: Tayyip ve Emine ("Children of Moses: Tayyip and Emine"), Togan Yayıncılık, 2007
 Musa'nın Gül'ü ("The Rose of Moses"), Togan Yayıncılık, 2007
 Patlak Ampul ("Broken Lamp"), Togan Yayıncılık, İstanbul, 2007.
 Amerika'daki İmam ("The Imam in America"), 2009
 Takunyalı Führer,  Togan Yayıncılık, İstanbul, 2010.
 Tarikat, Siyaset, Ticaret ve Cinayet: Masonlarla El Ele, Togan Yayıncılık, 2011
 İplikçi: Kirli İlişkiler Yumağı, Tanyeri Kitap, 2013

References 

1963 births
Living people
Turkish non-fiction writers
Turkish conspiracy theorists
Kemalists
Antisemitism in Turkey
Critics of Christianity
Critics of Judaism
Critics of Islamism
Critics of Freemasonry
Yıldız Technical University alumni
Prisoners and detainees of Turkey
People convicted in the Ergenekon trials